Code page 1021 (CCSID 1021), also known as CP1021 or CH7DEC, is an IBM code page number assigned to the Swiss variant of DEC's National Replacement Character Set (NRCS). The 7-bit character set was introduced for DEC's computer terminal systems, starting with the VT200 series in 1983, but is also used by IBM for their DEC emulation. Similar but not identical to the series of ISO 646 character sets, the character set is a close derivation from ASCII with only twelve code points differing.

Code page layout

See also
National Replacement Character Set (NRCS)

References

1021